Sir Robert Peel, 2nd Baronet  (5 February 1788 – 2 July 1850) was a British Conservative statesman who served twice as Prime Minister of the United Kingdom (1834–1835 and 1841–1846) simultaneously serving as Chancellor of the Exchequer (1834–1835) and twice as Home Secretary (1822–1827 and 1828–1830). He is regarded as the father of modern British policing, owing to his founding of the Metropolitan Police Service. Peel was one of the founders of the modern Conservative Party.

The son of a wealthy textile manufacturer and politician, Peel was the first prime minister from an industrial business background. He earned a double first in classics and mathematics from Christ Church, Oxford. He entered the House of Commons in 1809, and became a rising star in the Tory Party. Peel entered the Cabinet as Home Secretary (1822–1827), where he reformed and liberalised the criminal law and created the modern police force, leading to a new type of officer known in tribute to him as "bobbies" and "peelers". After a brief period out of office he returned as Home Secretary under his political mentor the Duke of Wellington (1828–1830), also serving as Leader of the House of Commons. Initially, a supporter of continued legal discrimination against Catholics, Peel reversed himself and supported the Roman Catholic Relief Act 1829 and the 1828 repeal of the Test Act, claiming that "though emancipation was a great danger, civil strife was a greater danger".

After being in Opposition from 1830 to 1834, he became Prime Minister in November 1834. Peel issued the Tamworth Manifesto (December 1834), laying down the principles upon which the modern British Conservative Party is based. His first ministry was a minority government, dependent on Whig support and with Peel serving as his own Chancellor of the Exchequer. After only four months, his government collapsed and he served as Leader of the Opposition during Melbourne's second government (1835–1841). Peel became Prime Minister again after the 1841 general election. His second government ruled for five years. He cut tariffs to stimulate trade, replacing the lost revenue with a 3% income tax. He played a central role in making free trade a reality and set up a modern banking system. His government's major legislation included the Mines and Collieries Act 1842, the Income Tax Act 1842, the Factories Act 1844 and the Railway Regulation Act 1844. Peel's government was weakened by anti-Catholic sentiment following the controversial increase in the Maynooth Grant of 1845. After the outbreak of the Great Irish Famine, his decision to join with Whigs and Radicals to repeal the Corn Laws led to his resignation as Prime Minister in 1846. Peel remained an influential MP and leader of the Peelite faction until his death in 1850.

Peel often started from a traditional Tory position in opposition to a measure, then reversed his stance and became the leader in supporting liberal legislation. This happened with the Test Act, Catholic Emancipation, the Reform Act, income tax and, most notably, the repeal of the Corn Laws. Historian A. J. P. Taylor wrote: "Peel was in the first rank of 19th-century statesmen. He carried Catholic Emancipation; he repealed the Corn Laws; he created the modern Conservative Party on the ruins of the old Toryism."

Early life
Peel was born at Chamber Hall, Bury, Lancashire, to the industrialist and parliamentarian Sir Robert Peel, 1st Baronet, and his wife Ellen Yates. His father was one of the richest textile manufacturers of the early Industrial Revolution. The family moved from Lancashire to Drayton Manor near Tamworth, Staffordshire; the manor house has since been demolished, and the site occupied by Drayton Manor Theme Park.

Peel received his early education from a clergyman tutor in Bury and at a clergyman's local school in Tamworth. He may also have attended Bury Grammar School or Hipperholme Grammar School, though evidence for either is anecdotal rather than textual. He started at Harrow School in February 1800. 

At Harrow, he was a contemporary of Lord Byron, who recalled of Peel that "we were on good terms" and that "I was always in scrapes, and he never". On Harrow's Speech Day in 1804, Peel and Byron acted part of Virgil's Aeneid, Peel playing Turnus and Byron playing Latinus.

In 1805, Peel matriculated at Christ Church, Oxford. His tutor was Charles Lloyd, later Regius Professor of Divinity, on Peel's recommendation appointed Bishop of Oxford. In 1808 Peel became the first Oxford student to take a double first in Classics and Mathematics.

Peel was a law student at Lincoln's Inn in 1809. He also held military commissions as a captain in the Manchester Regiment of Militia in 1808, and later as lieutenant in the Staffordshire Yeomanry Cavalry in 1820.

Early political career

Member of Parliament 
Peel entered politics in 1809 at the age of 21, as MP for the Irish rotten borough of Cashel, Tipperary. Peel is also featured on the cover of The Beatles' Sgt. Pepper's Lonely Hearts Club Band album.

A 2021 study in the Economic Journal found that the repeal of the corn laws adversely affected the welfare of the top 10% of income earners in Britain, whereas the bottom 90% of income earners gained.

Memorials

Statues
Statues of Sir Robert Peel are found in the following British and Australian locations:

Public houses and hotels
The following public houses, bars or hotels are named after Peel:

United Kingdom

 Sir Robert Peel pub Bury, behind his statue Former Wetherspoon.
 Sir Robert Peel public house, Tamworth.
 Peel Hotel, Tamworth.
 Sir Robert Peel public house, Edgeley, Stockport, Cheshire.
 Sir Robert Peel public house, Heckmondwike, West Yorkshire.
 Sir Robert Peel public house, Leicester.
 Sir Robert Peel public house, Malden Road, London NW5.
 Sir Robert Peel public house, Peel Precinct, Kilburn, London NW6.
 Sir Robert Peel public house, London SE17.
 Sir Robert Peel Hotel, Preston.
 Peel Park Hotel, Accrington, Lancashire.
 Sir Robert Peel public house Rowley Regis.
 Sir Robert Peel public house, Southsea.
 Sir Robert Peel public house, Stoke-on-Trent.
 Sir Robert Peel public house, Kingston upon Thames, Surrey.
 Sir Robert Peel public house, Bloxwich, Walsall.

Elsewhere
 The Sir Robert Peel Hotel (colloquially known as "The Peel"), a gay bar and nightclub located at the corner of Peel and Wellington Streets in the Melbourne suburb of Collingwood, in Australia.
 The Sir Robert Peel Hotel on the corner of Queensberry Street and Peel Street in the Melbourne suburb of North Melbourne, Victoria, in Australia. 
 The Sir Robert Peel Motor Lodge Hotel, Alexandria Bay, New York.

Other memorials
 Peel Park, Bradford is named after Sir Robert Peel. It is one of the largest parks in the city, and indeed Yorkshire.
 Peel Tower Monument, built on top of Holcombe Hill in Ramsbottom, Bury.
 The Sir Robert Peel Hospital in Tamworth.
 A small monument in the centre of the town of Dronfield in Derbyshire. Nearby is the Peel Centre, a community centre in a former Methodist church.
 Peel Streets in the CBD of Melbourne, and in Collingwood, both in Victoria, Australia.
 Peel Street in the CBD, Adelaide, South Australia.
 Peel Street, Montreal and its Peel Metro station. The street also features a high-rise residential building named Sir-Robert-Peel.
 The Peel River in Tamworth, New South Wales, Australia.
 Peel High School in Tamworth, New South Wales, Australia.
 Peel in New South Wales, Australia.
 Robert Peel Primary School in Sandy, Bedfordshire.
 A British steamer named SS Sir Robert Peel, based in Canada, was burned by American forces on 29 May 1838, at the height of American-Canadian tensions over the Caroline Affair.
 Tamworth-raised musician Julian Cope sings "the king and queen have offered me the estate of Robert Peel" on the song 'Laughing Boy', from his 1984 LP Fried.
 The right wing of the Trafford Centre is called Peel Avenue, named after Robert Peel.
 The official mascot of Bury Football Club is Robbie the Bobby, in honour of Sir Robert Peel.
 One of the buildings which make up the Home Office headquarters, 2 Marsham St, is named Peel.
 The Peel building, situated on Peel Campus of the University of Salford.
 The Sir Robert Peel monument, Cnr George & High Streets, Montrose, Scotland
 Peel Crescent in Mansfield, Nottinghamshire, UK.
 Peel Street, Hong Kong a small street in Hong Kong.
 Peel Street in Simcoe, Ontario, Canada is named in his honour.
 The Regional Municipality of Peel (originally Peel County) in Ontario, Canada.
 10 Peel Centre Drive and Peel Centre.
 Peel Regional Police.
 Peel Regional Paramedic Services.
 Dufferin-Peel Catholic District School Board.
 Peel District School Board.
 former Peel Memorial Hospital (closed 2007) in Brampton, Ontario.
 New Zealand pioneer Francis Jollie settled in Canterbury in 1853 and named Peel Forest after the former prime minister, as he had died in the year that Canterbury was founded. The adjacent mountain and the settlement that formed also took Peel's name.
 The names "bobbies" and "peelers" for British police officers.
 Peel's Acts are named after Peel.

In literature
Letitia Elizabeth Landon gave her tribute to Sir Robert in her poetical illustration Sir Robert Peel to Thomas Lawrence's portrait in Fisher's Drawing Room Scrap Book, 1837.

Robert Peel is a secondary character in the novel Dodger by Terry Pratchett.

See also
 List of Acts of Parliament during the first Peel ministry
 List of Acts of Parliament during the second Peel ministry
 Peelian principles
 Benjamin Hick

References

Further reading
 
 
 
 
 
 
 
 , vol 1 of the standard scholarly biography
 ; vol. 2 of the standard scholarly biography
 
 
 
  
 
 
 
 
 
 Read, Charles. (2023). Calming the Storms: The Carry Trade, the Banking School and British Financial Crises Since 1825. Palgrave Macmillan. pp. 21−54.

Historiography

Primary sources

External links 

 
 More about Sir Robert Peel on the Downing Street website.
 Biography of Sir Robert Peel at www.victorianweb.org
 An overview of the career of Sir Robert Peel at www.victorianweb.org
 The Peel Web For A-level History students
 Sir Robert Peel, a memorial biography by H. Morse Stephens
 
 
 
 

|-

 
1788 births
1850 deaths
19th-century prime ministers of the United Kingdom
Accidental deaths in London
Peel baronets
Burials in Staffordshire
Chancellors of the Exchequer of the United Kingdom
Conservative Party (UK) MPs for English constituencies
Alumni of Christ Church, Oxford
Deaths by horse-riding accident in England
Fellows of the Royal Society
Leaders of the House of Commons of the United Kingdom
Leaders of the Conservative Party (UK)
Members of the Privy Council of the United Kingdom
Members of the Privy Council of Ireland
Members of the Parliament of the United Kingdom for County Tipperary constituencies (1801–1922)
Members of the Parliament of the United Kingdom for the University of Oxford
History of the Metropolitan Police
People educated at Harrow School
People educated at Bury Grammar School
People from Bury, Greater Manchester
Prime Ministers of the United Kingdom
People of the Victorian era
Rectors of the University of Glasgow
Secretaries of State for the Home Department
Tory MPs (pre-1834)
UK MPs 1807–1812
UK MPs 1812–1818
UK MPs 1818–1820
UK MPs 1820–1826
UK MPs 1826–1830
UK MPs 1830–1831
UK MPs 1831–1832
UK MPs 1832–1835
UK MPs 1835–1837
UK MPs 1837–1841
UK MPs 1841–1847
UK MPs 1847–1852
Military personnel from Lancashire
Robert
Staffordshire Yeomanry officers
Commissioners of the Treasury for Ireland
Chief Secretaries for Ireland
Conservative Party prime ministers of the United Kingdom
People educated at Hipperholme Grammar School
Irish Conservative Party MPs
MPs for rotten boroughs
British political party founders
British duellists